The MS Georg Ots was a cargo/passenger ferry that sailed between Helsinki, Finland and Tallinn, Estonia from 1980 to 2000.  From 2002 it was used as a cargo/passenger ferry that sailed between Saint Petersburg and Baltiysk. The ship was built for the Estonian Shipping Company. The 12,600-ton ship (length 134 meters, breadth 21 meters, draft 5,7 meters) could carry 1200 passengers, thirteen 13.6 m-long trailers or 107 passenger cars. It was named after the Estonian baritone, Georg Ots.  In 2002 she was sold to the St. Petersburg Shipping Company and sailed until 2010. In 2012 the ship was rented to an unnamed company that sailed it to China and illegally sold it to be scrapped.

See also
 Dmitriy Shostakovich-class ferry

References

External links
Tallink Ferry Postcards

Ferries of Estonia
Transport in Tallinn
Transport in Helsinki
Passenger ships of the Soviet Union
Ships built in Szczecin
1979 ships